SMS Cöln was a light cruiser in the German Kaiserliche Marine, the second to bear this name, after her predecessor  had been lost in the Battle of Heligoland Bight. Cöln, first of her class, was launched on 5 October 1916 at Blohm & Voss in Hamburg and completed over a year later in January 1918. She and her sister  were the last two light cruisers built by the Kaiserliche Marine; eight of her sisters were scrapped before they could be completed. The ships were an incremental improvement over the preceding  cruisers.

Cöln was commissioned into service with the High Seas Fleet ten months before the end of World War I; as a result, her service career was limited and she did not see action. She participated in a fleet operation to Norway to attack British convoys to Scandinavia, but they failed to locate any convoys and returned to port. Cöln was to have participated in a climactic sortie in the final days of the war, but a revolt in the fleet forced Admirals Reinhard Scheer and Franz von Hipper to cancel the operation. The ship was interned in Scapa Flow after the end of the war and scuttled with the fleet there on 21 June 1919, under orders from the fleet commander Rear Admiral Ludwig von Reuter. Unlike many of the other ships  scuttled there, Cöln was never raised for scrapping.

Design

In the first year after the start of World War I in July 1914, the German  (Imperial Navy) suffered heavy losses among its light cruisers; by late 1915, the decision was made to begin construction on replacements. The navy was no longer constrained by the naval laws that had previously governed expenditures, and war funding was allocated for the construction of ten new vessels. Owing to the need to begin work as quickly as possible, only minor alterations were made to the preceding  design, including the number of anti-aircraft guns and the location of the torpedo tubes.

Her propulsion system consisted of two sets of steam turbines, which drove a pair of screw propellers. Steam was provided by eight coal-fired and six oil-fired Marine-type water-tube boilers. The boilers were ducted into three funnels amidships. Her crew consisted of 17 officers and 542 enlisted men.

The ship was armed with eight  SK L/45 guns in single pedestal mounts. Two were placed side by side forward on the forecastle, four were located amidships, two on either side, and two were arranged in a super firing pair aft. They were supplied with 1,040 rounds of ammunition, for 130 shells per gun. Cöln also carried three 8.8 cm SK L/45 anti-aircraft guns mounted on the centerline astern of the funnels, though one was removed in 1918. She was also equipped with a pair of  torpedo tubes with eight torpedoes in deck-mounted swivel launchers amidships. She also carried 200 mines.

Service history

Construction and wartime operations
Cöln, named after the light cruiser of the same name that was sunk at the Battle of Heligoland Bight on 28 August 1914, was ordered under the contract name "Ersatz ". Her keel was laid down at the Blohm & Voss shipyard in Hamburg in 1915. She was launched on 5 October 1916, after which fitting-out work commenced. Most of the ship's initial crew came from the light cruiser . Cöln began sea trialsin early February and completed them at the end of March. The ship then returned to the shipyard to have a new anti-mine device fitted. On 13 May, she was assigned to II Scouting Group.

By the last year of the war, II Scouting Group was primarily responsible for protecting the minelayers that maintained the defensive mine barrages that protected the entrances to Germany's naval bases in the North Sea. During this period, on 19 June, Cöln and the rest of the unit sortied in an unsuccessful attempt to catch the aircraft carrier  after she had struck the German seaplane base in the Tondern raid. In late August, Cöln helped to lay a minefield off Texel. The ship incurred damage to her screws in September, and had to be dry-docked from 19 September to 11 October for repairs. At that time, Raeder was transferred to the Armistice Commission at Spa, Belgium, that negotiated the Armistice of 11 November 1918 that ended the war. In the meantime, FK Kaulhausen took command of Cöln.

In October 1918, the two ships and the rest of II Scouting Group were to lead a final attack on the British navy. Cöln, Dresden, Pillau, and Königsberg were to attack merchant shipping in the Thames estuary while the rest of the Group were to bombard targets in Flanders, to draw out the British Grand Fleet. Scheer intended to inflict as much damage as possible on the British navy, in order to secure a better bargaining position for Germany, whatever the cost to the fleet. On the morning of 29 October 1918, the order was given to sail from Wilhelmshaven the following day. The unrest ultimately forced Hipper and Scheer to cancel the operation. When informed of the situation, the Kaiser stated, "I no longer have a navy."

On 9 November, two days before the armistice was to go into effect, British warships were reported to be in the area, and Cöln, Graudenz, and several torpedo boats were sent to intercept them, but they made no contact. There, she made preparations to be interned in Scapa Flow.

Internment and scuttling

Following the capitulation of Germany in November 1918, most of the High Seas Fleet's ships, under the command of Rear Admiral Ludwig von Reuter, were interned in the British naval base in Scapa Flow. Cöln was among the ships interned. On the voyage there on 19 November, while steaming in the Firth of Forth, Heinemann radioed the fleet commander that one of the ship's steam turbines had a leaking condenser. Reuter dispatched another light cruiser to remain with the ship in the event that she needed to be towed. The ship was delayed by three days, but despite the problematic turbine, Cöln managed to steam into port, arriving there on 22 November.

The fleet remained in captivity during the negotiations that ultimately produced the Versailles Treaty. Reuter believed that the British intended to seize the German ships on 21 June 1919, which was the deadline for Germany to have signed the peace treaty. Unaware that the deadline had been extended to the 23rd, Reuter ordered the ships to be sunk at the next opportunity. On the morning of 21 June, the British fleet left Scapa Flow to conduct training maneuvers, and at 11:20 Reuter transmitted the order to his ships. Cöln sank at 13:50 and was never raised for scrapping. In 2017, marine archaeologists from the Orkney Research Center for Archaeology conducted extensive surveys of Cöln and nine other wrecks in the area, including six other German and three British warships. The archaeologists mapped the wrecks with sonar and examined them with remotely operated underwater vehicles as part of an effort to determine how the wrecks are deteriorating.

Notes

References

Further reading
 
 

Cöln-class cruisers
Ships built in Hamburg
1916 ships
World War I cruisers of Germany
World War I warships scuttled at Scapa Flow
Maritime incidents in 1919